Events from the year 1780 in Ireland.

Incumbent
Monarch: George III

Events
August – passenger boat service begins on Grand Canal between Dublin and Sallins.
Sacramental Test abolished.
Henry Grattan demands parliamentary independence.
Lady Berry, sentenced to death for the murder of her son, is released when she agrees to become an executioner (retires 1810).
The model cotton manufacturing town of Prosperous, County Kildare, developed by Robert Brooke (East India Company officer), begins to function.
The whiskey company John Jameson is established.

Births
January – William Henry Fitton, geologist (died 1861).
12 March – David Barry, military surgeon and physiologist (died 1835).
20 March – Myles Byrne, a leader of the Irish Rebellion of 1798 and soldier in the service of France (died 1862).
13 April – Alexander Mitchell, engineer and inventor of the screw-pile lighthouse (died 1868).
May – Amhlaoibh Ó Súilleabháin, author, teacher, draper and politician (died 1838).
17 August – George Croly, poet, novelist, historian and divine (died 1860).
1 December – Edward Bowen, lawyer and politician in Lower Canada (died 1866).
20 December – John Wilson Croker, statesman and author (died 1857).

Full date unknown
Michael John Brenan, priest and ecclesiastical historian (died 1847).
Thady Connellan, schoolteacher and writer (died 1854).
Anne Devlin, republican and housekeeper to Robert Emmet (died 1851).

Deaths
2 February – Thomas Waite, civil servant (born 1718).
3 June – Henry Denny Denson, soldier and politician in Nova Scotia (born c.1715).
25 August – William Bowles, naturalist (born 1705).
October (drowned at sea) – Robert Boyle-Walsingham, British Royal Navy officer and politician (born 1736).
19 November – Jocelyn Deane, politician (born 1749).

References

 
1780s in Ireland
Years of the 18th century in Ireland
Ireland